The 1988 United States Senate election in West Virginia took place on November 8, 1988. Incumbent Democratic U.S. Senator Robert Byrd won re-election to a sixth term.

Candidates

Democratic 
 Robert Byrd, incumbent U.S. Senator

Republican 
 Jay Wolfe, state senator

Results

See also 
 1988 United States Senate elections

References 

West Virginia
1988
1988 West Virginia elections
Robert Byrd